Russellite may refer to:

Russellite (mineral)
Russellite Unionist
Bible Student movement, Christian groups which emerged from teachings of Charles Taze Russell (1852–1916)